Duchess Says is a Canadian punk band from Montreal.

History
Duchess Says was formed in late 2003. The band consists of vocalist and guitarist Annie-Claude Deschênes, keyboardist and guitarist Ismael Tremblay, guitarist and bassist Philippe Clément and percussionist Simon "Simon Says" Besre.

After releasing a single and an EP in 2006, Duchess Says released their first album, Anthologie des 3 Perchoirs. in 2008. They have been playlisted on CBC Radio 3 and Bande à part, been featured in the soundtrack from the film The Tracey Fragments, the soundtrack from the film Shadow in the Cloud, and have performed at Eurockéennes and the Osheaga Festival. In 2009, they supported Yeah Yeah Yeahs on dates during their winter tour of venues in the UK.

In 2011 the band's album In a Fung Day T! was released. The album appeared on the !earshot Campus and Community National Top 50 Albums chart in January, 2012, and that year the band toured in the United States.  In 2015 the band performed at the Festival of Emerging Music in Rouyn-Noranda, Quebec.

In 2016, Duchess Says released the album Science Nouvelles, and toured in support of the album.

Discography

Albums
Anthologie des 3 Perchoirs (August 26, 2008, Alien8 Recordings)
In a Fung Day T! (October 11, 2011, Alien8 Recordings)
Sciences Nouvelles (October 14, 2016, Slovenly Recordings)

EPs
Noviçiat Mère-Perruche (2005, Summer Lovers Unlimited Music)
Black Flag (2006, Summer Lovers Unlimited Music)
Begging the 3 Ts (2009, Alien8 Recordings)
Duchess Says / Le Prince Harry (Split with Le Prince Harry) (2015, Teenage Menopause Records)

Singles
 Fire Baptized Species (7" split with Red Mass) (2009, Alien8 Recordings)
 Black Flag (Maxi-Single) (2009, Back Yard Recordings)
 Negative Thoughts 7" (2016, GoodToGo Records)

Soundtrack
The Tracey Fragments (Various Artists) (May 13, 2008, Lakeshore Records)
Shadow in the Cloud (2020) (Various Artists)

Compilations
Montreal Noise and Friends (Various Artists) (2006)
Digital Penetration Volume 2 (Various Artists) (2008)

See also

Music of Canada
Music of Quebec
Canadian rock
List of Canadian musicians
List of bands from Canada

References

External links
 Myspace site
 
 Bandcamp site

Musical groups established in 2003
Canadian indie rock groups
Canadian punk rock groups
Dance-punk musical groups
Musical groups from Montreal